The Carnival is a one-reel 1911 American motion picture produced by Kalem Company and directed by Sidney Olcott with Gene Gauntier and Jack J. Clark in the leading role.

Cast
 Jack J. Clark - Jerome
 Gene Gauntier - His wife

External links

 The Carnival website dedicated to Sidney Olcott

1911 films
Silent American drama films
American silent short films
Films directed by Sidney Olcott
1911 short films
1911 drama films
American black-and-white films
1910s American films